Andrea Berrino (born 14 February 1994) is an Argentine swimmer. She competed in the women's 50 metre backstroke event at the 2017 World Aquatics Championships.

References

External links
 

1994 births
Living people
Argentine female swimmers
Place of birth missing (living people)
South American Games silver medalists for Argentina
South American Games medalists in swimming
Competitors at the 2014 South American Games
Swimmers at the 2019 Pan American Games
Pan American Games bronze medalists for Argentina
Pan American Games medalists in swimming
Swimmers at the 2015 Pan American Games
Medalists at the 2019 Pan American Games
21st-century Argentine women